Kushgag (alternative names, Kušgag or Kusgag) is a village in Badakhshan Province in north-eastern Afghanistan.

Geography
The village lies towards the northern edge of the Hindu Kush mountain range which crosses over into Pakistan and is at an elevation of 

History
On 6 April 2004 the village was affected by the earthquake that affected parts of Badakhshan. Kushgag was only  from the earthquake epicentre and was listed by the European Union as an area of assistance following the quake.

Transport

References 

Populated places in Jurm District